Snakeplant or snake plant may refer to:

Dracaena trifasciata, synonym Sansevieria trifasciata, also called mother-in-law's tongue
Nassauvia serpens
Turbina corymbosa